Kenya competed at the 2022 Commonwealth Games at Birmingham, England from 28 July to 8 August 2022. It was Kenya's 17th appearance at the Games.

Ferdinand Omanyala and Carolina Wanjira were the country's opening ceremony flagbearers.

Medalists

Competitors
The following is the list of number of competitors participating at the Games per sport/discipline.

Athletics

Kenya selected a squad of six athletes (plus two reserves) for the marathons on 7 April 2022 (officially announced on 21 May 2022). Following the national trials, a squad of forty-three athletes and two more reserves was confirmed on 25 June 2022.

Men
Track & road events

Field events

Women
Track & road events

Field events

Badminton

Badminton Kenya is currently suspended as a consequence of internal election disputes. Following an appeal by NOC-K, Kenya received special permission from the BWF to participate in the Commonwealth Games badminton competition.

Following the selection trials in June 2022, two players were selected to represent Kenya in the competition.

3x3 basketball

By virtue of its status as the top Commonwealth African nation in the respective FIBA 3x3 Federation Rankings for men and women (on 1 November 2021), Kenya qualified for both tournaments. On 27 April 2022, it was also confirmed that Kenya received a Bipartite Invitation for the women's wheelchair tournament.

Summary

Men's tournament

Roster
Faheem Juma
George Omondi
Larry Shavanga
John Wijass

Group A

Quarterfinals

Women's tournament

Roster
Victoria Reynolds
Madina Okot
Hilda Indasi
Melissa Otieno

Group A

Quarterfinals

Women's wheelchair

Roster
Carolina Wanjira
Eunice Otieno
Rahel Alar
Stella Tiyoy

Group A

Fifth place match

Beach volleyball

Kenya was awarded a Bipartite Invitation for the women's tournament.

Women's tournament

Group A

Boxing

Four boxers were selected for the competition on 4 July 2022.

Cycling

Track
Time trial

Mountain Biking

Hockey

By virtue of its position in the FIH Women's World Ranking (as of 1 February 2022), Kenya qualified for the women's tournament.

Detailed fixtures were released on 9 March 2022. Eighteen players and seven reserves were named on 16 June 2022.

Women's tournament

Summary

Squad
 
Quinter Okore (gk)
Millicent Adhiambo (gk)
Beatrice Mbugua
Lynn Mumbi
Aurelia Opondo
Joan Anjao
Moureen Owiti
Flavia Mutiva
Caroline Guchu
Lynn Tamunai Kipsang
Maureen Okumu
Alice Owiti
Eleanor Chebet
Gilly Okumu
Jeriah Onsare
Nichole Odhiambo
Grace Bwire
Naomi Kemunto

Reserves: Tracy Karanja, Gaudencia Ochieng, Elsie Jemutai, Vivian Onyango, Rhoda Kuira, Beverly Akoth, Maroline Wabomba

Group play

Ninth place match

Judo

Two judoka were selected as of 18 June 2022.

Lawn bowls

Para powerlifting

Rugby sevens

As of 9 November 2021, Kenya qualified for the men's tournament. This was achieved through their positions in the 2018–19 / 2019–20 World Rugby Sevens Series.

The thirteen-man roster was officially named on 12 July 2022.

Summary

Men's tournament

Roster
 
Nelson Oyoo (c)
Herman Humwa
Alvin Otieno
Vincent Onyala
Bush Mwale
Kevin Wekesa
Anthony Omondi
Johnstone Olindi
Billy Odhiambo
Edmund Anya
Daniel Taabu
Levy Amunga
Willy Ambaka

Pool D

Quarterfinals

5th-8th Semifinals

Squash

Swimming

Men

Women

Mixed

Table tennis

Two players were officially selected as of 8 July 2022.

Singles

Doubles

Triathlon

Four triathletes (two per gender) were initially selected on 13 March 2022. Following a formal complaint that women's trials winner Megan Irungu had not covered the entire course, a second trials race was held (won by Aisha Nasser). The NOC-K ordered a third iteration as the swimming leg of the second race was not held in open water; Nasser won that race as well.

Individual

Weightlifting

Wrestling

References

External links
National Olympic Committee of Kenya Official site

Nations at the 2022 Commonwealth Games
Kenya at the Commonwealth Games
2022 in Kenyan sport